Paolo Vasile (born 1953) is an Italian businessman and film and television producer. He served as the CEO of Gestevisión Telecinco/Mediaset España from 1999 to 2022.

Biography 
Born in Rome in 1953, Vasile was the last of four siblings, son to producer, screenwriter, director, author and critic Turi Vasile and Silvana Gualdi. He studied Anthropology and worked as film producer for ten years.

An acquaintance of media tycoon Silvio Berlusconi since the early 1980s, Vasile switched cinema for television, reportedly encouraged by his wife Ana Lisa. He became deputy director general of Mediaset and responsible for the production facilities of the company in Rome.

Berlusconi sent him to Spain in 1998 in order to get Telecinco back on track, becoming Berlusconi's right-hand man in Spain. After Vasile was appointed CEO of Gestevisión Telecinco (later Mediaset España) on 30 March 1999, Telecinco consolidated as the leading TV channel in Spain in terms of viewership. He led the company when it went public in 2004 and during the merging deal agreement with PRISA.

He has been criticised for the rise of the so-called  ("trash TV") in Spain. In 2022, amid consistently decreasing viewership figures, he was reportedly fired from his position as CEO of Mediaset España.

References 

Mediaset España Comunicación
Italian film producers
Italian businesspeople
Italian television producers
1953 births
Living people